Avraam "Akis" Kallinikidis (born 1977, in Greece) is a Greek professional basketball player. He is 1.97 m (6 ft 5  in) tall. He can play at both the small forward and power forward positions.

Professional career
Kallinikidis began his professional career with Aigaleo. After playing with Egaleo for 13 years, he moved to AEK Athens in 2009. In 2014, he signed with Arkadikos. In 2016, he joined Holargos of the Greek A2 League.

References

External links
Eurobasket.com Profile
Greek Basket League Profile 

1977 births
Living people
AEK B.C. players
Aigaleo B.C. players
Arkadikos B.C. players
Basketball players from Athens
Greek Basket League players
Greek men's basketball players
Holargos B.C. players
Oiakas Nafpliou B.C. players
Power forwards (basketball)
Rethymno B.C. players
Small forwards